Miss America 1997, the 70th Miss America pageant, was held at the Boardwalk Hall in Atlantic City, New Jersey on Saturday, September 14, 1996 and televised by the NBC Network. Until the 2019 Pageant, this was the last time that NBC aired the Miss America pageant.

Results

Placements

Order of announcements

Top 10

Top 5

Awards

Preliminary awards

Quality of Life awards

Other awards

Delegates
The Miss America 1997 delegates are:

Judges
Joseph Barbara
Barbara De Angelis
Janet Evans
Nancy Fleming
Jackie Joyner-Kersee
Deborah Norville
Scott O'Grady

References

External links
 Miss America official website

1997
1996 in the United States
1997 beauty pageants
1996 in New Jersey
September 1996 events in the United States
Events in Atlantic City, New Jersey